Osmán Huerta (born June 16, 1989) is a Chilean footballer as a striker.

Career
He played at Deportes Antofagasta between 2007 and 2011, where he won the Primera B Apertura 2011.

In 2013, Huerta played for Curicó Unido, playing 17 matches and scoring 4 goals for the Primera B.

O'Higgins
Huerta in 2013 signed for O'Higgins from Curicó Unido on a one-year loan. On December 10, 2013, he won the Apertura 2013-14 with O'Higgins. In the tournament, he played in 10 of 18 matches, and scored a goal in the win 3:4 against Rangers de Talca.

In 2014, he won the Supercopa de Chile against Deportes Iquique, in the match that O'Higgins won at the penalty shoot-out.

He participated with the club in the 2014 Copa Libertadores where they faced Deportivo Cali, Cerro Porteño and Lanús, being third and being eliminated in the group stage. 

In 2014, Huerta played for Deportes Antofagasta and in 2015 come back to Curicó Unido.

Honours

Club
Deportes Antofagasta
Primera B: Apertura 2011

O'Higgins
Primera División: Apertura 2013-14
Supercopa de Chile: 2014

Individual
O'Higgins
Medalla Santa Cruz de Triana: 2014

References

External links
 Profile at BDFA 
 

1989 births
Living people
Chilean footballers
Curicó Unido footballers
C.D. Antofagasta footballers
O'Higgins F.C. footballers
Coquimbo Unido footballers
Chilean Primera División players
Primera B de Chile players
Association football forwards
People from Antofagasta